Oxana Andreevna Voevodina (born 10 July 1992 in Taganrog), also known as Rihana Petra, is a Russian model who is the former wife of Sultan Muhammad V of Kelantan. They married during his reign as the 15th Yang di-Pertuan Agong (King of Malaysia) and divorced soon after his abdication as King. She is also a beauty pageant winner and was crowned  in 2015.

Biography 
Voevodina Oxana was raised and educated in Taganrog, a city in the Rostov Oblast, Russia. Her father, Andrei Ivanovich Gorbatenko, is an orthopedic surgeon from Rostov-on-Don, with clinics in Rostov-on-Don and Taganrog. Her mother Lyudmila Voevodina, a concert pianist, who worked at the Bolshoi. Oxana had learned English by attending an Oxford summer school. She later pursued an undergraduate degree in economics at Plekhanov Russian University of Economics (PRUE) in Moscow and eventually obtained a master's degree in management. As a beauty pageant contestant, Voevodina won the Miss Moscow title in 2015.

Personal life
On 22 November 2018, Voevodina secretly married Sultan Muhammad V of Kelantan and the 15th Yang di-Pertuan Agong or King of Malaysia as his second wife, in Moscow, Russia without the knowledge of her husband's first wife. Her husband first wife is Sultanah Nur Diana Petra. They also already had a traditional Malay wedding in Malaysia on 7 June 2018 prior to the Russian wedding celebration. She had converted to Islam that same year, in April 2018 and changed her name to Rihana Oxana Petra adopting the family name of Muhammad V. While the purported wedding was widely covered and discussed on social media, as of January 2019 no official statement has been released to confirm or deny that matter. With effect from  6 January 2019, Sultan Muhammad abdicated as Yang di-Pertuan Agong of Malaysia, almost three years before his term of office was due to end; commentators suggested this was prompted by opposition to his marriage to Voevodina.  

The media reported the birth of their son Tengku Ismail Leon Petra bin Tengku Muhammad V Faris Petra on 21 May 2019 in Moscow. On 22 June 2019, a month after the birth of their mutual son, Muhammad V divorced Voevodina in Singapore by a "talak tiga" (third talaq) or talaq baayin, the irrevocable divorce executed by simply announcing to his wife that he dissolves the marriage, which is considered to be the most offensive and disapproved type of divorce in Islam.  

During the TV interview with Russian presenter and top female opposition politician Ksenia Sobchak, Voevodina had revealed the Czech wife of Muhammad V, Diana Yakubková reached out to her and her father insulting and threatening her son in June 2019. This incident was widely discussed in the British and Russian media.

After Voevodina had posted photos of their life together on her Instagram account, the Kelantan palace finally issued official statement on 6 September 2019 rebuking the matter as untrue by condemning postings of the monarch's private life on social media as inappropriate and defamatory. The sultan somehow expressed 'regret' regarding his personal choices of his private life that has caused the peoples' confusion, albeit without mentioning any names; apparently had acknowledged the marriage did occur.

See also
 Oxana - name

References

External links
 

1993 births
Living people
People from Astrakhan
Russian people of Polish descent
Russian people of Ukrainian descent
Russian expatriates in Malaysia
Malaysian people of Russian descent
Malaysian people of Polish descent
Malaysian people of Ukrainian descent
Malaysian Muslims
Russian Muslims
Converts to Islam from Eastern Orthodoxy
Former Russian Orthodox Christians
Russian former Christians
Russian beauty pageant winners
Russian female models
Russian television personalities
Plekhanov Russian University of Economics alumni